Jan Sherud (also Romanized as Jān Sherūd; also known as Jāneshrūh) is a village in Tutaki Rural District, in the Central District of Siahkal County, Gilan Province, Iran. At the 2006 census, its population was 54, in 16 families.

References 

Populated places in Siahkal County